Heroes' Cemetery may refer to:

 Giri Tunggal Heroes' Cemetery in Semarang, Central Java, Indonesia
 Libingan ng mga Bayani in Taguig, Philippines
 Kalibata Heroes Cemetery in South Jakarta, Indonesia
 Kuching Heroes Cemetery in Kuching, Sarawak, Malaysia
 Kusumanegara Heroes' Cemetery, also known as Semaki Heroes' Cemetery, in Yogyakarta, Indonesia
 Maaveerar Thuyilum Illam (heroes' resting place), Tamil Eelam, Sri Lanka
 Martyrs' Cemetery (Korçë), Korca, Albania